Yannick Pandor (born 1 May 2001) is a footballer who plays as a goalkeeper for Lens. Born in France, he represents Comoros internationally.

Club career
Pandor is product of the youth academies of Michelis, Marseille and Bel Air. He started his career with the reserves of the French club Lens in 2018. On 27 July 2022, he signed a professional contract with the club until 2023.

International career
Pandor was born in France to a Martiniquais father and a mother of Malagasy and Comorian descent. He represented the Comoros U20s at the 2022 Maurice Revello Tournament. He debuted with the senior Comoros national team in a friendly 2–1 win over Ethiopia on 25 March 2022.

References

External links
 
 
 
 [ligue1.com/player?id=yannick-pandor Ligue 1 profile]

2001 births
Living people
Footballers from Marseille
Comorian footballers
Comoros international footballers
Comoros under-20 international footballers
French footballers
Comorian people of Martiniquais descent
Comorian people of Malagasy descent
French sportspeople of Comorian descent
French people of Martiniquais descent
French sportspeople of Malagasy descent
Association football goalkeepers
Championnat National 2 players
RC Lens players